Day One is the debut studio album by American rock band From Ashes to New. The album was released on February 26, 2016. A deluxe edition was released on November 18, 2016, which contains the acoustic version of "Lost and Alone" and three new tracks.  This deluxe edition was exclusively digital, with no Compact Disc or LP Record versions available.

Critical reception 
The album received mixed to positive reviews. In a positive review by RockFeed, reviewer Brian Storm states "Day One features a plethora of larger than life choruses and infectious melodies, something that will likely pay off for them on rock radio." and in another positive review by Randy Shatkowski of Anti-Hero Magazine, he says that "The triple-threat of clean, soaring vocals, in your face rap, and guttural roars makes for a unique combination, even if the individual pieces have been used before.". Johnny Guagliardo of KillYourStereo.com says in a mixed review that "Day One seems to follow some (unintended) weird formula, which gives you a good song then a not so good one..." and goes on to say that "They’re recycling everything you heard in 1998, 2003 and then once again in 2007, merely under a new packaging."

Track listing

Personnel 
Credits adapted from AllMusic
From Ashes to New
Matthew Brandyberry - rap vocals, keyboards, programming
Chris Musser - unclean vocals, clean vocals
Lance Dowdle - lead guitar
Branden Kreider - rhythm guitar, unclean backing vocals
Tim D'onfrio - drums, percussion

Additional personnel
Daniel Kecki - guitar 
Garrett Russell - bass guitar

Production
Brian Gardner - mastering
Grant McFarland - engineer, mixing, producer, backing vocals
Adam Serrano - art direction, design
Carson Slovak - engineer, mixing

Chart performance

References

2016 debut albums
From Ashes to New albums